Rear Admiral (Junior Grade) Patrick Duze (born Athlone, 19 October 1957) is a South African Navy officer currently serving as Director Force Preparation at the Joint Operations Division

He went to school at Gugulethu and Langa High before becoming in student politics. He was detained between 1976 and 1978 in Pretoria Central Prison. In 1986 he left the country and returned in May 1992. He enrolled for an electrical engineering course but left to join the Navy on integration of the forces in 1994.

He took over the command of SAS Wingfield in February 2000.

He served as Chief of Fleet Staff at Fleet Command from January 2006 to April 2007 before being appointed Director
Naval Policy and Doctrine.

He became the General Officer Commanding of the South African National War College in 2011.

He is due to retire voluntarily on 31 March 2017.

References

South African admirals
Living people
1957 births